Ashurbanipal (Neo-Assyrian cuneiform:  , meaning "Ashur is the creator of the heir") was the king of the Neo-Assyrian Empire from 669 BCE to his death in 631. He is generally remembered as the last great king of Assyria. Inheriting the throne as the favored heir of his father Esarhaddon, Ashurbanipal's 38-year reign was among the longest of any Assyrian king. Though sometimes regarded as the apogee of ancient Assyria, his reign also marked the last time Assyrian armies waged war throughout the ancient Near East and the beginning of the end of Assyrian dominion over the region.

Esarhaddon selected Ashurbanipal as heir  673. The selection of Ashurbanipal bypassed the elder son Shamash-shum-ukin. Perhaps in order to avoid future rivalry, Esarhaddon designated Shamash-shum-ukin as the heir to Babylonia. The two brothers jointly acceded to their respective thrones after Esarhaddon's death in 669, though Shamash-shum-ukin was relegated to being Ashurbanipal's closely monitored vassal. Much of the early years of Ashurbanipal's reign was spent fighting rebellions in Egypt, which had been conquered by his father. The most extensive campaigns of Ashurbanipal were those directed towards Elam, an ancient enemy of Assyria, and against Shamash-shum-ukin, who gradually began to resent the overbearing control that his younger brother held over him. Elam was defeated in a series of conflicts in 665, 653 and 647–646. Shamash-shum-ukin rebelled in 652 and assembled a coalition of Assyria's enemies but was defeated and died during Ashurbanipal's siege of Babylon in 648. On account of a lack of surviving records, much of Ashurbanipal's late reign is poorly known.

Ashurbanipal is chiefly remembered today for his cultural efforts. A patron of artwork and literature, Ashurbanipal was deeply interested in the ancient literary culture of Mesopotamia. Over the course of his long reign, Ashurbanipal utilized the massive resources at his disposal to construct the Library of Ashurbanipal, a collection of texts and documents of various different genres. Perhaps comprising over 100,000 texts at its height, the Library of Ashurbanipal was not surpassed until the construction of the Library of Alexandria, several centuries later. The more than 30,000 cuneiform texts that have survived from the library are a highly important source on ancient Mesopotamian language, religion, literature and science. Artwork produced under Ashurbanipal was innovative in its style and motifs and is regarded to possess an "epic quality" otherwise absent from much of the art produced under previous kings.

Ashurbanipal was remembered in Greco-Roman literary tradition under the name Sardanapalus, erroneously characterized as the effeminate and decadent last king of Assyria and blamed for the fall of his empire. Whether the fall of the Assyrian Empire only two decades after his death is attributable to Ashurbanipal or not is disputed in modern Assyriology. Ashurbanipal is recognized as one of the most brutal Assyrian kings; he was one of the few kings to describe massacres of civilians and the one with the most varied methods in enacting them. His extensive destruction of Elam is regarded by some scholars to amount to a genocide. The Assyrians were militarily successful under Ashurbanipal, campaigning further away from the Assyrian heartland than ever before, but several of his campaigns had little overall effect. Ashurbanipal failed to maintain control of Egypt, his wars in Arabia cost time and resources without leading to the establishment of Assyrian control in the region, and his extensive sack of Babylon after defeating Shamash-shum-ukin fanned anti-Assyrian sentiment in southern Mesopotamia, perhaps contributing to the rise of the Neo-Babylonian Empire five years after Ashurbanipal's death.

Background and accession

Becoming the heir to Assyria 

Born  685 BC, Ashurbanipal was a son of his predecessor Esarhaddon. Though Ashurbanipal's inscriptions suggest that he was divinely preordained to rule, his accession was far from straightforward, and its political complexities sowed the seeds for later civil war. Ashurbanipal was probably Esarhaddon's fourth eldest son, younger than Esarhaddon's first crown prince Sin-nadin-apli and the other two sons Shamash-shum-ukin and Shamash-metu-uballit. He also had an older sister, Serua-eterat, and several younger brothers. The Assyrian court was thrown into upheaval upon the unexpected death of Sin-nadin-apli in 674. Esarhaddon wished to avoid his eventual death initiating a succession crisis; his own accession had only been accomplished with great difficulty and as such he quickly began drawing up new succession plans. Esarhaddon soon decided upon proclaiming the next eldest son Shamash-shum-ukin as the heir to Babylonia (southern Mesopotamia) and Ashurbanipal as the heir to Assyria, designating the two as "equal brothers". The third eldest son, Shamash-metu-uballit, older than Ashurbanipal, was entirely bypassed, perhaps because he suffered from poor health.

Esarhaddon's decision to bypass Shamash-shum-ukin for the Assyrian throne was a remarkable one given that the difficulties with Esarhaddon's own accession were the direct result of his father Sennacherib acting in a similar way. Sennacherib had bypassed the elder son Arda-Mulissu in favor of the younger Esarhaddon; in Sennacherib's case this decision led to Arda-Mulissu murdering him and fighting a civil war against Esarhaddon. Why Esarhaddon made nearly the same decision is not clear. Promoting one of his sons as the heir to Assyria and another as the heir to Babylon was a novel idea; for the past decades the Assyrian king had simultaneously been the king of Babylon. The decision to leave Babylonia to Shamash-shum-ukin and to designate the two as "equal brothers" might have been intended to counteract the possible damage inherit in designating Ashurbanipal as the sole heir, avoiding future jealousy and rivalry. One hypothesis in regard to why a younger son was designated as the heir to what was clearly Esarhaddon's primary title is that Ashurbanipal and Shamash-shum-ukin could have had different mothers. Though it is equally likely that Shamash-shum-ukin and Ashurbanipal shared a mother, possibly Esharra-hammat (Esarhaddon's primary consort), it is also possible that Ashurbanipal was the son of an Assyrian woman and Shamash-shum-ukin was the son of a Babylonian woman; Shamash-shum-ukin accceding to the Assyrian throne could thus have been problematic.

After Esarhaddon made his decision, the two princes arrived at the Assyrian capital of Nineveh together and partook in a celebration in May 672 with foreign representatives, Assyrian nobles and elements of the military. Since the name Ashurbanipal (Aššur-bāni-apli) means "Ashur is the creator of the heir", it was likely granted to him at this time; what name Ashurbanipal used before he became crown prince is not known. It was also perhaps around this time that Ashurbanipal married his future queen, Libbali-sharrat.

Crown prince and accession 

After he was designated as crown prince, Ashurbanipal entered what the Assyrians called the "House of Succession", the palace of the crown prince. As crown prince, Ashurbanipal began to undergo training for traditional royal duties. Among the various skills Ashurbanipal was trained in during this time were hunting, riding, scholarship and wisdom, archery, chariotry and other forms of military training. Because Esarhaddon was constantly ill, much of the administrative duties of the empire fell upon Ashurbanipal and Shamash-shum-ukin during the last few years of their father's reign. It was important for the crown princes to gain real experience in ruling. Letters of correspondence between Esarhaddon and Ashurbanipal from this time show that Ashurbanipal prominently participated in the Assyrian intelligence network, gathering information on foreign enemies and rivals and compiling reports for his father.

Ashurbanipal became the king of Assyria in late 669 following Esarhaddon's death, having been crown prince for only three years. Upon his accession, he was possibly the most powerful person on the planet, but there appears to have been some fears of trouble. His grandmother Naqi'a wrote a treaty, dubbed the Zakutu Treaty by modern historians, in which she forced the royal family, aristocracy and all of Assyria to swear loyalty to her grandson. There however appears to have been no strong opposition to Ashurbanipal's rise to power. Shamash-shum-ukin was somewhat belatedly crowned as king of Babylon in the spring of the next year. His coronation was marked by Ashurbanipal returning the religiously important Statue of Marduk, stolen by Sennacherib twenty years prior, to Babylon. Shamash-shum-ukin would rule at Babylon for sixteen years, apparently mostly peacefully in regard to his younger brother, but there would be repeated disagreements on the exact extent of his control.

Treaties drawn up by Esarhaddon are somewhat unclear as to the relationship he intended his two sons to have. It is clear that Ashurbanipal was the primary heir to the empire and that Shamash-shum-ukin was to swear him an oath of allegiance but other parts also specify that Ashurbanipal was not to interfere in Shamash-shum-ukin's affairs, indicating an intent for a more equal standing between them. Though it is possible that Ashurbanipal intentionally ignored Esarhaddon's wishes and shifted the balance of power in his own favor by diminishing Shamash-shum-ukin's intended status, such a decision might have been primarily motivated by Ashurbanipal fearing that granting his older brother a strong power-base would present a threat to his own continued rule.

Military campaigns

Egyptian campaigns 

Egypt was conquered in 671 by Ashurbanipal's father Esarhaddon, who defeated the Kushite Pharaoh Taharqa. The conquest of Egypt was one of Esarhaddon's greatest accomplishments, the first time Egypt had ever been under Assyrian rule, and brought the Assyrian Empire to its greatest extent. Assyrian control of Egypt was weak, however, and Taharqa escaped to Nubia in the south, scheming to retake his lands. Esarhaddon sent troops to garrison Egyptian cities and appointed local Egyptian nobles as vassal rulers of the country. In 669, Taharqa reappeared from the south and led Egypt in a revolt against Assyria. Esarhaddon left Nineveh to defeat Taharqa but fell ill and died on the way. Esarhaddon's death and the lack of an Assyrian response to Taharqa's actions, owing to Ashurbanipal's coronation and affairs at home, inspired many of the Egyptian vassal rulers to join the revolt and rid Egypt of Assyrian dominion and influence. After news reached Ashurbanipal of a massacre of the Assyrian garrison in Memphis, Ashurbanipal sent an army to quell the uprising and bring the rebels to Nineveh in chains.

The Assyrian army collected tribute from the various Levantine vassal states on their way to Egypt. Many of the vassal rulers, such as Manasseh of Judah and various rulers from Cyprus, also bolstered the Assyrian forces through providing additional equipment and troops. The Assyrian army and its allies fought their way through Egypt. A decisive battle was won at the city of Kar-Banitu in Lower Egypt. According to Assyrian sources, the Egyptian defeat at Kar-Banitu impelled Taharqa and his close supporters to abandon Memphis, flee to Thebes and then escape to Nubia once more. Shortly thereafter, the Assyrian army captured Memphis. Some conspirators, including the local vassal ruler Necho I, had remained at Memphis and were taken back to Assyria and forced to swear new oaths of loyalty. Some of the captured Egyptian nobles were unexpectedly allowed to return and resume their posts in Egypt, Necho among them.

After Taharqa's death in 664, his nephew Tantamani proclaimed himself pharaoh and invaded Egypt, swiftly gained control of Thebes and then marching toward Memphis. Ashurbanipal once again sent the Assyrian army to secure control. According to Ashurbanipal's account, Tantamani abandoned his efforts and fled south as soon as the Assyrian army entered Egypt. In retaliation for supporting Tantamani, the Assyrians captured and heavily plundered Thebes, one of the major political and religious centers in Egypt. Ashurbanipal's sack of Thebes was the most serious calamity to ever befall the ancient city. The city might only have been saved from being wholly razed to the ground through skillful diplomacy by its governor Mentuemhat. Tantamani was not pursued beyond the Egyptian border. Upon the return of the Assyrian army to Nineveh, spoils from Thebes were paraded through the streets and many treasures and obelisks were melted down so that their material could be used for Ashurbanipal's projects.

Initial Elamite conflicts 

In 665, the Elamite king Urtak, who had kept peaceful relations with Esarhaddon, launched a surprise attack against Babylonia. Urtak was successfully driven back into Elam, dying shortly thereafter. He was succeeded as Elamite king by Teumman, who was unrelated to the previous monarch and had to stabilize his rule by killing his political rivals. Three of Urtak's sons, chief rival claimants to the Elamite throne, escaped to Assyria and were harbored by Ashurbanipal, despite Teumman demanding them to be returned to Elam.

Following the 665 victory over the Elamites, Ashurbanipal had to deal with a series of revolts within his own borders. Bel-iqisha, chieftain of the Gambulians (an Aramean tribe) in Babylonia, rebelled after he had been implicated as supporting the Elamite invasion and was forced to relinquish some of his authority. Little is known of this revolt, but there is a letter preserved in which Ashurbanipal orders the governor of Uruk, Nabu-usabsi, to attack Bel-iqisha. Nabu-usabsi apparently claimed that Bel-iqisha was solely to blame for the Elamite invasion. Bel-iqisha's revolt does not appear to have caused much damage and he was killed shortly after revolting by a boar. Shortly thereafter in 663, Bel-iqisha's son Dunanu also surrendered to Ashurbanipal.

After a long period of peace, Teumman attacked Babylonia in 653. Because Ashurbanipal had not entrusted Shamash-shum-ukin with any substantial military forces, he was unable to defend Babylonia against the Elamite invasion and had to rely on Ashurbanipal for military support. Ashurbanipal's army first advanced south and secured the city of Der. Though Teumman marched to meet the Assyrians, he soon changed his mind and fell back to the Elamite capital of Susa. The final battle in the war with Teumman, the Battle of Ulai, took place near Susa and was a decisive Assyrian victory, partly due to defections in the Elamite army. Teumann was killed in the battle, as was one of his vassals, Shutruk-Nahhunte of Hidalu. In the aftermath of his victory, Ashurbanipal installed two of Urtak's sons as rulers, proclaiming Ummanigash as king at Madaktu and Susa and Tammaritu I as king at Hidalu. This intervention into the Elamite succession weakened both Elamite opposition towards Assyria and Elamite royal authority. In his inscriptions, Ashurbanipal described his victory at Ulai with the following account:

Dunanu, who had joined the Elamites in the war, was captured alongside his family and executed. The Gambulians were attacked by Ashurbanipal's army and brutally punished, with their capital of Shapibel being flooded and many of its inhabitants slaughtered. In Dananu's stead, Ashurbanipal appointed a noble called Rimutu as the new Gambulian chieftain after he had agreed to pay a considerable sum in tribute to the Assyrian king.

Diplomacy and incursions into Assyria 

The Cimmerians, a nomadic Indo-European people living in the southern Caucasus north of Assyria, had invaded Assyria during the reign of Ashurbanipal's father. After Esarhaddon defeated them, the Cimmerians turned to attack Lydia in western Anatolia, ruled by Gyges. After allegedly receiving advice from the Assyrian national deity Ashur in a dream, Gyges sent his diplomats to ask Ashurbanipal for assistance. The Assyrians did not even know that Lydia existed; after the two states successfully established communication with the help of interpreters, the Cimmerian invasion of Lydia was defeated  665. Two Cimmerian chiefs were imprisoned in Nineveh and large amounts of spoils were secured by Ashurbanipal's forces. The extent to which the Assyrian army was involved in the Lydian campaign is unknown, but it appears that Gyges was disappointed with the help since he just twelve years later broke his alliance with Ashurbanipal and allied with the increasingly independent Egypt instead. After this, Ashurbanipal cursed Gyges. When Lydia was overrun by its enemies  652–650 there was much rejoicing in Assyria.

While the Assyrian forces were on campaign in Elam, an alliance of Persians, Cimmerians and Medes marched on Nineveh and managed to reach the city's walls. To counteract this threat, Ashurbanipal called on his Scythian allies and successfully defeated the enemy army. The Median king, Phraortes, is generally held to have been killed in the fighting. This attack is poorly documented and it is possible that Phraortes wasn't present at all and his unfortunate death instead belongs to a Median campaign during the reign of one of Ashurbanipal's successors.

After his death  652, Gyges was succeeded by his son Ardys. Because the Scythians had driven the Cimmerians from their homes, the Cimmerians invaded Lydia again and successfully captured most of the kingdom. As his father had before him, Ardys also sent for aid from Ashurbanipal, stating that "You cursed my father and bad luck befell him; but bless me, your humble servant, and I will carry your yoke". It is unknown if any Assyrian aid arrived, but Lydia was successfully freed from the Cimmerians. They would not be driven out of Lydia completely until the reign of Ardys's grandson Alyattes.

Civil war with Shamash-shum-ukin

Rising tensions and rebellion 

Although Esarhaddon's inscriptions suggest that Shamash-shum-ukin should have been granted the entirety of Babylonia to rule, contemporary records only definitely prove that Shamash-shum-ukin held Babylon itself and its vicinity. The governors of some Babylonian cities, such as Nippur, Uruk and Ur, and the rulers in the Sea Land, all ignored the existence of a king in Babylon and saw Ashurbanipal as their monarch. Despite this, Shamash-shum-ukin had initially been positively inclined towards his brother, viewing him as his equal. In letters, Shamash-shum-ukin addressed Ashurbanipal simply as "my brother" (unlike how he addressed his father Esarhaddon, "the king, my father"). Although there are several letters preserved from Shamash-shum-ukin to Ashurbanipal, there are no known replies. It is possible that Ashurbanipal, on account of his network of informers, did not feel a need to write to his brother. By the 650s, Shamash-shum-ukin's opinion of Ashurbanipal had significantly deteriorated, owing to the increasing intervention and involvement of Ashurbanipal in Babylonian affairs, Ashurbanipal often delaying when help was needed, and growing dissatisfaction with his position relative to that of Ashurbanipal. A letter written during this time by Zakir, a courtier at Shamash-shum-ukin's court, to Ashurbanipal described how visitors from the Sea Land had publicly criticized Ashurbanipal in front of Shamash-shum-ukin, using the phrase "this is not the word of a king!". Zakir reported that though Shamash-shum-ukin was angered, he and his governor of Babylon, Ubaru, chose to not take action against the visitors.

Aspiring to become independent of Ashurbanipal and free Babylonia under his own rule, Shamash-shum-ukin revolted in 652. According to later Aramaic-language legends, Ashurbanipal and Shamash-shum-ukin's sister Serua-eterat attempted to intervene and stop the two from fighting; after the war broke out the legends hold that she disappeared into self-imposed exile. The war between the brothers lasted for three years. In addition to resenting Ashurbanipal's overbearing control, Shamash-shum-ukin's revolt was also facilitated by the certainty of support in the south: the Babylonians constantly resented Assyrian control and the rulers of Elam were certain allies, always willing to join anyone who waged war against Assyria. Inscription evidence suggests that Shamash-shum-ukin addressed the citizens of Babylon to join him in his revolt. In Ashurbanipal's inscriptions, Shamash-shum-ukin is quoted to have said "Ashurbanipal will cover with shame the name of the Babylonians", which Ashurbanipal refers to as "wind" and "lies". Soon after Shamash-shum-ukin began his revolt, the rest of southern Mesopotamia rose up against Ashurbanipal alongside him. The beginning of Ashurbanipal's account of the conflict reads as follows:

According to the inscriptions of Ashurbanipal, Shamash-shum-ukin was very successful in finding allies. Ashurbanipal identified three groups who aided his brother: first and foremost there were the Chaldeans, Arameans and the other peoples of Babylonia, then there were the Elamites, and lastly the kings of Gutium, Amurru and Meluhha. This last group of kings might refer to the Medes (as Gutium, Amurru and Meluhha no longer existed at this point) but this is uncertain. Meluhha might have referred to Egypt, though the Egyptians are not documented to have aided Shamash-shum-ukin in the war. Shamash-shum-ukin's ambassadors to the Elamites had offered gifts (called "bribes" by Ashurbanipal) and their king, Ummanigash, sent an army under the command of Undashe, the son of Teumman, to aid in the conflict. For the first two years of the conflict, battles were fought all across Babylonia, some won by the Assyrians and some won by Shamash-shum-ukin and his allies. The war quickly turned chaotic; several minor players repeatedly changed sides and both Ashurbanipal and Shamash-shum-ukin found it difficult to keep track of their allies. Among the most notorious double agents were Nabu-bel-shumati, a governor of the far south in Babylonia whose repeated betrayals enraged Ashurbanipal.

Fall of Shamash-shum-ukin 

Despite this seemingly strong alliance of Assyrian enemies, Shamash-shum-ukin failed to halt Ashurbanipal's advance. As the war progressed, his forces were slowly defeated, his allies diminished and his lands were lost. By 650 the situation looked grim, with Ashurbanipal's forces having besieged Sippar, Borsippa, Kutha and Babylon itself. During Ashurbanipal's siege of Babylon, the city entered into a period of famine. Ashurbanipal's account of the siege claimed that some of the citizens grew so hungry and desperate that they ate their own children. Having endured both starvation and disease, Babylon fell in 648, after a siege lasting two years. The city was extensively plundered by Ashurbanipal. According to his own inscriptions, Ashurbanipal initiated a bloodbath: "their carved up bodies I fed to dogs, to pigs, to wolves, to eagles, to birds of the heavens, to fishes of the deep". At the time of the city's fall, a great fire also spread within Babylon. Shamash-shum-ukin is traditionally believed to have committed suicide by stepping into the flames, or by setting himself and his family on fire in his palace. Contemporary texts however only say that he "met a cruel death" and that the gods "consigned him to a fire and destroyed his life". In addition to suicide through self-immolation or other means, it is possible that he was executed, died accidentally or was killed in some other way. If Shamash-shum-ukin was executed, it would be logical for the Assyrian scribes to leave this out of historical records since fratricide (killing a brother) was illegal and even if a soldier (and not Ashurbanipal) had carried it out, it would still constitute a murder of a member of the Assyrian royal family.

After Shamash-shum-ukin's defeat, Ashurbanipal appointed a new vassal king of Babylon, Kandalanu, of whom little is known. Kandalanu's realm was the same as Shamash-shum-ukin's with the exception of the city of Nippur, which Ashurbanipal converted into a powerful Assyrian fortress. The authority of Kandalanu is likely to have been very limited and few records survive of his reign at Babylon. He might have been another one of Ashurbanipal's brothers or perhaps a Babylonian noble who had allied with Ashurbanipal in the civil war and had consequently been rewarded with the rank of king. Kandalanu probably lacked any true political and military power, which was instead firmly in the hands of Ashurbanipal.

Due to the defeat and death of a member of the Assyrian royal family, the defeat of Shamash-shum-ukin was Ashurbanipal's most problematic victory. The civil war also had significant broader consequences impacting Assyrian dominion. Though Babylonia slowly recovered after the war, the war exhausted economic resources and decreased the power and authority of the Assyrian Empire. Signs of decline had already been visible before the civil war but its conclusion is regarded by modern historians to mark the end of the height of Assyrian authority. Ashurbanipal's sack of Babylon, the second extensive sack of the city in thirty years, also fanned anti-Assyrian sentiment in southern Babylonia and might thus have been a decisive factor in the Babylonian revolt by Nabopolassar a few years after Ashurbanipal's death, which led to the formation of the Neo-Babylonian Empire and the fall of Assyria.

Destruction of Elam 

The Elamite effort to support Shamash-shum-ukin in the civil war had largely come to an end with the early defeat of Ummanigash's army near the city of Der. As a result of Ummanigash's defeat, he was deposed in Elam by Tammaritu II, who then took the throne for himself. Ummanigash fled to the Assyrian court where he was granted asylum by Ashurbanipal. Tammaritu II's rule was brief and despite success in some battles against the Assyrians, alongside the rogue governor Nabu-bel-shumati (already notorious for his role in the war with Shamash-shum-ukin), he was deposed in another revolt in 649. The new king, Indabibi, had an extremely brief reign and was murdered after Ashurbanipal threatened to invade Elam again because of the kingdom's role in supporting Shamash-shum-ukin and his other enemies.

In Indabibi's stead, Humban-haltash III became king in Elam. Nabu-bel-shumati continued fighting against Ashurbanipal from outposts within Elam and though Humban-haltash was in favor of giving up the Chaldean rebel, Nabu-bel-shumati had too many supporters in Elam in order for this to go through. Because Humban-haltash could thus not respond to Ashurbanipal's threats, the Assyrians invaded Elam again in 647. After the Elamite defense collapsed, Humban-haltash abandoned his seat at Madaktu and fled into the mountains. He was briefly replaced as king by Tammaritu II, who regained his throne. After the Assyrians had plundered the region of Khuzestan they returned home, prompting Humban-haltash to reemerge from the mountains and retake the throne.

The Assyrians returned to Elam in 646 and Humban-haltash again abandoned Madaktu, fleeing first to the city Dur-Untash and then into the mountains in eastern Elam. Ashurbanipal's forces pursued him, plundering and razing cities on their way. All major political centers in Elam were crushed and nearby chiefdoms and petty kingdoms who had previously paid tribute to the Elamite king began paying tribute to Ashurbanipal instead. Among these kingdoms was Parsua, possibly a predecessor of the empire that would be founded by the Achaemenids a century later. Parsua's king, Cyrus (possibly the same person as Cyrus I, the grandfather of Cyrus the Great), had originally sided with the Elamites at the beginning of the campaign, and had thus been forced to supply his son Arukku as a hostage. Countries which had never previously had contact with the Assyrians, such as a kingdom ruled by a king called Ḫudimiri which "extended beyond Elam", also began paying tribute to the Assyrians for the first time.

On their way back from their campaign, the Assyrian forces brutally plundered Susa. In Ashurbanipal's triumphant inscriptions detailing the sack it is described in great detail, recounting how the Assyrians desecrated the royal tombs, looted and razed temples, stole the statues of the Elamite gods and sowed salt in the ground. The ancient Elamite capital was wiped off the face of the Earth and Ashurbanipal then continued with the destruction of Elamite settlements on a massive scale. In addition to the destruction of numerous cities, thousands of those Elamites who were not killed were deported away from their homeland. Ashurbanipal's brutal suppression of Elam is sometimes considered a genocide. The detail and length of Ashurbanipal's inscriptions concerning the destructions suggest that the events were meant to shock the world, signalling the defeat and eradication of the Elamites as a distinct cultural entity.

Despite the thorough and brutal campaign, the Elamites endured as a political entity for some time. Ashurbanipal did not annex Elam, instead leaving it to its own devices. Humban-haltash returned to rule at Madaktu and (belatedly) sent Nabu-bel-shumati to Ashurbanipal, though the Chaldean committed suicide on his way to Nineveh. After Humban-haltash was deposed, captured and sent to the Assyrians in a revolt shortly thereafter, Assyrian records cease to speak of Elam. Elam was ultimately unable to ever fully recover from Ashurbanipal's efforts in 646 and was left open to attack from tribes and kings in the surrounding lands, eventually disappearing altogether from the historical record.

Arabian campaigns 

Assyrian interests in the Levant and other western territories were at times challenged on account of Arab tribal groups raiding Assyrian territories or disrupting trade. On occasion, the Assyrian army intervened, deposing and replacing problematic tribal rulers. Ashurbanipal oversaw two campaigns against Arab tribes, though their chronology is somewhat uncertain and his narrative of these conflicts was altered over the course of his later reign. The Arabian campaigns have received relatively little attention from modern historians but they are the conflicts with the most lengthy and detailed accounts in Ashurbanipal's own writings.

Ashurbanipal's first campaign against the Arabs was conducted some time before the war with Shamash-shum-ukin, primarily against the Qedarites. Ashurbanipal's earliest account of his campaign against the Qedarites was created in 649 and describes how Yauta, son of Hazael, king of the Qedarites, revolted against Ashurbanipal together with another Arab king, Ammuladdin, and plundered the western lands of the Assyrian Empire. According to Ashurbanipal's account, the Assyrian army, together with the army of Kamas-halta of Moab, defeated the rebel forces. Ammuladdin was captured and sent in chains to Assyria but Yauta escaped. In the place of Yauta a loyal Arabian warlord called Abiyate was granted kingship of the Qedarites. Ashurbanipal's account of this conflict is markedly different from the accounts of his other campaigns: the phrase "in my nth campaign" (otherwise always used) is missing, the defeat of the enemy is explicitly attributed to the army rather than to Ashurbanipal personally, and Yauta escapes rather than being captured and/or executed. A second version of the narrative, composed a year later, also includes that Ashurbanipal defeated Adiya, a queen of the Arabs, and that Yauta fled to another chieftain, Natnu of the Nabayyate, who refused him and remained loyal to Ashurbanipal. Even later versions of the narrative also include mentions of how Yauta previously revolted against Esarhaddon, years prior. These later accounts also explicitly connect Yauta's rebellion to the revolt of Shamash-shum-ukin, placing it at the same time and suggesting that the western raids by the Arabs were prompted by the instability caused by the Assyrian civil war. In both accounts, the Qedarite lands were thoroughly plundered at the conclusion of the war.

Some of the Arab tribal leaders joined Shamash-shum-ukin in the Assyrian civil war. Among them were Abiyate, made king by Ashurbanipal's forces, and his brother Aya-ammu, who sent soldiers to Babylonia. Because of Ashurbanipal's focus on Elam, they initially escaped retaliation and punishment. As the Elamite wars dragged on, several Arab rulers ceased to pay tribute to Ashurbanipal and began raiding nearby Assyrian settlements, severely disrupting trade. This development proved enough for Ashurbanipal's generals to organize a major campaign to restore order. Ashurbanipal's account of this conflict largely concerns the movements of his army through Syria in search of Uiate (conflated with Yauta but possibly a different person) and his Arabian soldiers. According to the account, the Assyrian army marched from Syria to Damascus and then on to Hulhuliti, after which they captured Abiyate and defeated Uššo and Akko. The Assyrians were reportedly faced with great difficulties during this war on account of the unfamiliar and hostile terrain. The Nabayyate, who had aided Ashurbanipal in the previous campaign, are mentioned as being defeated in the second war against the Arabs, without any further information on what had led to the change in their relationship between the two campaigns. The last known version of the Arabian narrative specifies the two campaigns as together composing Ashurbanipal's ninth campaign and further expands them with more details. In this version, Abiyate and Ammuladdin are specified to have joined Shamash-shum-ukin. Ashurbanipal is in this version also for the first time personally credited with the victories of the campaign. This later version also states that Uiate was captured and paraded in Nineveh together with prisoners captured during the wars in Elam, that Uiate was hitched up to Ashurbanipal's hariot like a horse, and that Aya-ammu was flayed alive.

Supposedly spoils brought back from the Arabian campaigns were so extensive that they caused inflation in the Assyrian Empire and famine in Arabia. Despite this, and despite being impressive in the sense that no previous Assyrian ruler had campaigned against the Arabs with the same vigor, Ashurbanipal's Arabian campaigns are sometimes assessed as a strategic blunder. The two wars were time-consuming, wasted valuable resources and failed to consolidate Assyrian rule over any of the lands they took place in.

Late reign and succession 

The end of Ashurbanipal's reign and the beginning of the reign of his son and successor, Ashur-etil-ilani, is shrouded in mystery on account of a lack of available sources. Events in Ashurbanipal's reign after 649 are relatively poorly recorded since the secure eponym canon (known Assyrian year names) ends in that year. After 639, only two inscriptions by Ashurbanipal are known, a sharp contrast to the abundant records known from previous years. This scarcity of documentation might reflect the beginning of a serious internal political crisis. Ashurbanipal's late reign appears to have seen a growing disconnect between the king and the traditional elite of the empire. Ashurbanipal heavily promoted eunuchs to prominent positions, to the detriment of the nobility and aristocracy. At some point late in his reign, the chief singer, Bullutu, was made eponym, an unprecedented and perhaps self-indulgent move. Some Assyriologists, such as Eckart Frahm, have drawn parallels between the sparse evidence from Ashurbanipal's late reign and Sardanapalus, in Greco-Roman literary tradition the decadent last king of Assyria, based on Ashurbanipal. Ashurbanipal himself recognized that he had failed to maintain the durability of the Assyrian Empire. In one of his final known inscriptions, Ashurbanipal, saddened and faced with his own mortality due to illness, lamented the state of his empire. This inscriptions reads:

In addition to internal strife, it is clear that the hold of the Assyrian Empire on its peripheral regions had severely weakened by the end of Ashurbanipal's reign. Some peripheral lands had regained independence; there was for instance no longer an Assyrian presence in the southern Levant, where the Egyptians had instead become the hegemonic power. Ashurbanipal's late reign may have also seen the beginning of rebellious movements in Babylonia (precursors of that of Nabopolassar). Egypt already regained independence in the middle of Ashurbanipal's reign. Egypt appears to have been liberated peacefully and gradually under Necho I's son and successor Psamtik I, who had been educated at the Assyrian court. After becoming king in 664 as a loyal Assyrian vassal, Psamtik slowly extended his control across all of Egypt, unifying the country in 656 and initiating a period of renaissance and prosperity, eventually becoming fully independent of Ashurbanipal. Psamtik remained an ally of Assyria; during the later Medo-Babylonian conquest of the Assyrian Empire in the reign of Sinsharishkun (Ashur-etil-ilani's successor and another son of Ashurbanipal) both Psamtik and his son Necho II rushed to Assyria's aid, with Egyptian armies fighting alongside the Assyrians.

Inscriptions by Ashur-etil-ilani suggest that his father died a natural death, but do not shed light on when or how this happened. Though his final year is often erroneously given as 627 or even 626, this follows an estimate from an inscription written nearly a century later at Harran by Adad-guppi, the mother of the Neo-Babylonian king Nabonidus. The final contemporary evidence for Ashurbanipal being alive and reigning as king is a contract from Nippur made in 631. If Ashurbanipal's reign had ended in 627 the inscriptions of his successors Ashur-etil-ilani and Sinsharishkun in Babylon (covering several years) would have been impossible, given that the city was seized by Nabopolassar in 626 and never again fell into Assyrian hands. To get the attested lengths of the reigns of his successors to match, it is generally agreed that Ashurbanipal either died, abdicated or was deposed in 631 or 630. 631 is typically favored as the year of his death. Ashurbanipal was succeeded as king by Ashur-etil-ilani and he seems to have been inspired by the succession plans of his father, despite its consequences, given that Sinsharishkun was granted the fortress-city of Nippur and was designated to be the successor of Kandalanu at Babylon once Kandalanu died.

A handful of historians have attempted to justify a reign of Ashurbanipal extending to 627, though no such proposal is without problems. It is possible that the 42-year (rather than 38-year) error came about in later Mesopotamian historiography on account of the knowledge that Ashurbanipal ruled concurrently with Babylonian rulers Shamash-shum-ukin and Kandalanu, whose reigns together amount to 42 years, but Kandalanu survived Ashurbanipal by three years, actually dying in 627. One possible way to justify a 42-year reign of Ashurbanipal is by assuming there was a coregency between him and Ashur-etil-ilani, but there had never been a coregency in prior Assyrian history and the idea is explicitly contradicted by Ashur-etil-ilani's own inscriptions, which describe him as becoming king after the end of his father's reign. Another once popular idea, for instance favored by Stefan Zawadski, is that Ashurbanipal and Kandalanu were the same person, "Kandalanu" simply being the name the king used in Babylon. This idea is generally considered unlikely for several reasons, most notably that no previous Assyrian king is known to have used an alternate name in Babylon and that inscriptions from Babylonia show a difference in the lengths of the reigns of Ashurbanipal and Kandalanu (Ashurbanipal's reign is counted from his first full year as king, 668, and Kandalanu's is counted from his first full year as king, 647). All Assyrian kings who personally ruled Babylon used the title "king of Babylon" in their inscriptions, but that title is not used in any of Ashurbanipal's inscriptions, even those made after 648. Most importantly, Babylonian documents clearly treat Ashurbanipal and Kandalanu as two different people.

Family and children 

Ashurbanipal was already married to his queen Libbali-sharrat at the time of his accession to the throne, perhaps marrying her around the time of his proclamation as crown prince. The marriage occurring around that time is supported by Libbali-sharrat's name, which she is attested under before the death of Esarhaddon. The name is unique, not known to have been borne by any other individual, and incorporates the element šarratum ("queen"), indicating that it was not her birth name but rather a name perhaps assumed upon her marriage to Ashurbanipal. Libbali-sharrat is most famous for her appearance in the so-called "Garden Party" relief from Ashurbanipal's palace, which depicts her and Ashurbanipal dining together. The scene is noteworthy for being organized around Libbali-sharrat rather than Ashurbanipal and for being the only known image from ancient Assyria depicting an individual other than the king effectively holding court (and even hosting the king).

Three of Ashurbanipal's children are known by name, all sons:
Ashur-etil-ilani, who ruled as king 631–627,
Sinsharishkun, who ruled as king 627–612,
Ninurta-sharru-usur, who played no political role

Libbali-sharrat was presumably the mother of Ashurbanipal's immediate successors, Ashur-etil-ilani and Sinsharishkun. Ninurtas-sharru-usur's less prominent role probably derived from him being the son of a lower wife. Libbali-sharrat might have lived for some time after Ashurbanipal's death in 631 since there is a tablet dating to Ashur-etil-ilani's reign referencing the "mother of the king". The inscriptions of Sinsharishkun which mention him being selected for the kingship "from among his equals" (i.e., brothers) suggest that Ashurbanipal had more sons in addition to the three known by name. It is also known that Ashurbanipal had at least one daughter given that there are documents from his reign that reference a "daughter of the king".

Ashurbanipal's lineage may have survived the fall of Assyria in 612–609. The mother of the last Neo-Babylonian king Nabonidus, Adad-guppi, was from Harran and had Assyrian ancestry. According to her own inscriptions, Adad-guppi was born in the 20th year of Ashurbanipal's reign (648, as years were counted from the king's first full year). British scholar Stephanie Dalley considers it "almost certain" that Adad-guppi was a daughter of Ashurbanipal on account of her own inscriptions claiming that Nabonidus was of Ashurbanipal's dynastic line. American Professor of Biblical Studies Michael B. Dick has refuted this, pointing out that even though Nabonidus did go to some length to revive some old Assyrian symbols (such as wearing a wrapped cloak in his depictions, absent in those of other Neo-Babylonian kings but present in Assyrian art) and attempted to link himself to the Sargonid dynasty, there is "no evidence whatsoever that Nabonidus was related to the Sargonid Dynasty".

Character

Brutality 

In Assyrian royal ideology, the Assyrian king was the divinely appointed mortal representative of Ashur. The king was seen as having the moral, humane and necessary obligation to extend Assyria since lands outside Assyria were regarded to be uncivilized and a threat to the cosmic and divine order within the Assyrian Empire. Expansionism was cast as a moral duty to convert chaos to civilization, rather than exploitative imperialism. Because of the Assyrian king's role as Ashur's representative, resistance or rebellion against Assyrian rule was seen as fighting against divine will, which deserved punishment. Assyrian royal ideology perceived rebels as criminals against the divine world order. Though the royal ideology could thus be used to justify enacting brutal punishments against Assyria's enemies, levels of brutality and aggression varied considerably between kings and modern scholars do not view ancient Assyria as a whole as an unusually brutal civilization. Sargon II, the founder of Ashurbanipal's dynasty, is for instance known for several times forgiving and sparing defeated enemies. Most kings only enacted brutal acts against enemy soldiers or elites, not against civilians.

Under Ashurbanipal, the Assyrian army campaigned further away from the Assyrian heartland than ever before. Though Ashurbanipal, contrary to the image presented in some of his reliefs and sharply contrasting with his predecessors, probably only rarely (if at all) participated in the military campaigns during his reign, he clearly stands out among the Assyrian kings for his exceptional brutality. It is possible that Ashurbanipal's excessive brutality can be partially explained through religious zealotry; he is known to have rebuilt, repaired and expanded a majority of the major shrines throughout his empire and many of the actions he took during his reign were due to omen reports, something he was very interested in. He also appointed two of his younger brothers, Ashur-mukin-paleya and Ashur-etel-shame-erseti-muballissu, as priests in the cities Assur and Harran respectively.

When taking all Neo-Assyrian reliefs depicting scenes of brutality together, the highest concentration of them are from Ashurbanipal's reign. Reliefs with brutality scenes from Ashurbanipal's time account for 35% of all known such depictions from the Neo-Assyrian period. Ashurbanipal is also the most brutal king in terms of the variety of different scenes depicted. He is one of only four Neo-Assyrian kings (alongside Esarhaddon, Tiglath-Pileser III and Ashurnasirpal II) who in their inscriptions claimed to have killed civilians and the one with the most varied acts against them (including live flaying, dismemberment and impalement). There are also several instances where he is recorded to have brought captive enemies to Nineveh to enthusiastically torture and humiliate them. Women were rarely depicted being harmed in Assyrian artwork, but Ashurbanipal's reliefs include some prominent exceptions to this rule. One of the reliefs from Ashurbanipal's palace in Nineveh, given the modern designation BM 124927, includes both dead female bodies and direct attacks against women. The middle part of the relief includes the most brutal act against a woman ever recorded in an Assyrian relief: Assyrian soldiers ripping open a pregnant Arab woman.

Cultural pursuits

Library of Ashurbanipal 

Ashurbanipal portrayed himself as powerful in both body and mind. Typically portraying himself as carrying both weapons and a stylus, Ashurbanipal's inscriptions make him out to be unlike the kings before him, exceptionally well-versed in literature, writing, mathematics and scholarship. Deeply interested in the ancient literary culture of Mesopotamia, Ashurbanipal read complex texts in both Akkadian and Sumerian already in his youth. After he became king, Ashurbanipal, using the massive resources now at his disposal, created the world's first "universal" library in Nineveh. The resulting Library of Ashurbanipal is regarded to have been the by far most extensive library in ancient Assyria and the first systematically organized library in the world. In total it encompassed perhaps more than 100,000 texts and it was not surpassed in size until the creation of the Library of Alexandria, centuries later. Around 30,000 of the documents in the library survived the destruction of Nineveh in 612 and have been excavated among the city's ruins.
The library was assembled at Ashurbanipal's command, with scribes being sent out throughout the empire to collect and copy texts of every type and genre from the libraries of the temples. Most of the collected texts were observations of events and omens, texts detailing the behavior of certain men and of animals, texts on the movements of celestial objects and so forth. Present in the library were also dictionaries for Sumerian, Akkadian and other languages and many religious texts, such as rituals, fables, prayers and incantations. The library contained many tablets from Babylonia, both donated and taken as war booty. Ashurbanipal's library probably represented a comprehensive and accurate picture of Mesopotamian learning up until his time. Ashurbanipal himself considered the library to be the signature accomplishment of his reign. In his inscriptions, he boasted of his own intelligence and the library's construction:

The library was long remembered in Mesopotamia. As late as in the first century AD, scribes in Babylonia still referred to the long-lost library in some of their texts and letters. Most of the traditional Mesopotamian stories and tales known today, such as the Epic of Gilgamesh, the Enûma Eliš (the Babylonian creation myth), Erra, the Myth of Etana and the Epic of Anzu, only survived until the modern era because they were included in Ashurbanipal's library. The library covered the entire spectrum of Ashurbanipal's literary interests and also included folk tales (such as The Poor Man of Nippur, a predecessor of one of the tales in One Thousand and One Nights), handbooks and scientific texts.

Artwork 

Regarded as a patron of the arts, Ashurbanipal erected numerous sculptures and reliefs in his palaces in Nineveh, depicting the most important events from his long reign. Ashurbanipal's artwork was innovative in terms of Assyrian art history, often having an "epic quality" unlike much of the more static artwork produced under his predecessors. A motif appearing in several of Ashurbanipal's art pieces, for instance the Lion Hunt of Ashurbanipal, is the king killing lions, a propaganda image illustrating his glory and power, as well as his ability to safeguard the Assyrian people through slaying dangerous animals.

Various new elements can be seen in artwork produced under Ashurbanipal. The regalia of the king changes from relief to relief depending on the scene depicted; informal events for instance typically depict Ashurbanipal with an open crown design different from the typical vaguely bucket-shaped Assyrian crown. There are no known examples of art depicting Ashurbanipal seated on a throne or holding court, a common motif under previous kings, perhaps meaning that the symbol of the throne was losing its status in art, and possible also at court, during his reign. Ashurbanipal's artwork is the only ancient Assyrian art that depicts non-Assyrian foreigners as physically different (not only in their equipment and outfits but also in their features) from Assyrians. Possibly influenced by Egyptian art, which did depict foreigners differently, Ashurbanipal's reliefs show Elamites and Urartians as stockier, Urartians with larger noses, and Arabs with long straight hair (in contrast to the curly hair of the Assyrians). Inscriptions and annals from Ashurbanipal's time however offer no evidence that foreigners were seen as racially or ethnically different in terms of biology or physiognomy, which means that this might only have been an artistic choice.

Legacy

Sardanapalus legend 

Tales of Ashurbanipal survived in the cultural memory of the Near East. He is perhaps identifiable with the figure "Asnappar", briefly mentioned in the Biblical Book of Ezra (4:10). Ashurbanipal and other ancient Assyrian kings and figures continued to appear in the folklore and literary tradition of northern Mesopotamia for centuries.

The most prominent later legend concerning Ashurbanipal was the long-lived Greco-Roman Sardanapalus legend. The Sardanapalus of legend was according to the Assyriologist Maria de Fátima Rosa conceived as "more effeminate than a woman, a lascivious and idle man, a governor who loathed all expressions of militarism and war". This view stemmed from ancient Greek views on Mesopotamia in general; ancient Mesopotamian kings were typically seen by the Greeks as effeminate and dull despots incapable of securing the welfare for the people of their empires. The earliest known reference to Sardanapalus comes from the 5th-century BCE Histories of Herodotus, which includes a reference to the riches of Sardanapalus, king of Nineveh. Legendary tales in Aramaic, based on the civil war between Ashurbanipal ("Sarbanabal") and Shamash-shum-ukin ("Sarmuge"), are attested from the 3rd century BC.

The most elaborate and lengthy ancient text concerning Sardanapalus comes from the 1st-century BCE Bibliotheca historica of Diodorus Siculus. Siculus's portrayal of Sardanapalus was endowed with ancient Greek orientalism; the king was stated to have lived among women, dressed like them, used a soft voice and engaged in other activities viewed as unnatural for Greek men. In Siculus's account, Sardanapalus's satrap of Media, Arbaces, saw him mingling with women in the palace and quickly revolted, assaulting Nineveh together with the Babylonian priest Belesys. After failing to urge his soldiers to defend the city, Sardanapalus locked himself in his palace chamber, with treasures and concubines, and lit up a pyre, burning down the entire capital city and ending the Assyrian Empire. It is clear from the narrative that Siculus's Sardanapalus is based not only on Ashurbanipal but also on Shamash-shum-ukin and Sinsharishkun.

The Greek account of ancient Assyria transformed historical perception of the ancient empire and set the image of it in Western Europe for centuries. Since concrete evidence of Assyria and Babylonia was lacking, authors and artists during the Renaissance and Enlightenment based their interpretations of ancient Mesopotamia on classical Greco-Roman writings. In late 17th-century Italy, the composer Domenico Freschi wrote and performed the opera Sardanapalo, a comedic tragedy wherein Sardanapalus was portrayed as a woman-like and sex-eager king. In the opera, Sardanapalus after watching Nineveh crumble decides to light fire to his palace so that the Assyrian Empire did not fall without a show. In 1821, Lord Byron launched the historical tragedy play Sardanapalus, which pairs Sardanapalus with the legendary character Myrrah, often Sardanapalus's counterpart in later tales as well. Myrrah was in the story a female Greek slave and loyal supporter of Sardanapalus. In Byron's version, it was Myrrah who lit the palace on fire after Sardanapalus gave his last words, "Adieu, Assyria! I loved thee well!". Many operas, inspired by Byron, included similar storylines. It was typical to portray the fall of Nineveh and Assyria as a consequence of Assyria's supposed lack of moral values, combined with its ostentation and pomp.

Even after archaeologists and historians began to uncover the true history of ancient Assyria in the 19th century, the perception rooted in Greco-Roman tradition proved to be enduring. When the British archaeologist Austen Henry Layard found evidence of a major fire in the ruins of Nimrud (which he believed to be Nineveh) in 1845, his colleagues suggested that this was proof of the Sardanapalus legend. Even after discoveries made it clear that the Sardanapalus of legend was far from a perfect match of the Ashurbanipal of history, the legend was not forgotten. Instead, plays and films featuring Sardanapalus simply began to mix the legendary tale with historical details. Many plays began to incorporate Assyrian architectural details, such as lamassus. Two films based on the Sardanapalus legend have been produced in Italy; Giuseppe de Liguoro's Sardanapalo re dell'Assiria (1910) and Silvio Amadio's Le sette folgori di Assur (1962), both heavily influenced by Byron's play. Both follow Sardanapalus's relationship with Myrrah. In Amadio's film, the narrative is also inspired by Ashurbanipal's conflict with Shamash-shum-ukin, who appears in the film under the shortened name Shamash.

Modern perception

Rediscoveries and assessments 

The North Palace of Nineveh, constructed by Ashurbanipal, was rediscovered by the British-funded Assyrian archaeologist Hormuzd Rassam in December 1853. Rassam's excavations were a somewhat strange episode in Assyriology as his efforts were also marked by an intense rivalry with the French archaeologist Victor Place; despite agreements as to who should excavate where, Ashurbanipal's palace was found by Rassam during the night, when he sent out a team of excavators under the cover of darkness to dig in the French portion of the Nineveh excavation. Excavations where conducted in the palace in 1853–1854. Among other discoveries, Rassam recovered the reliefs making up the Lion Hunt of Ashurbanipal, which were taken from the palace and transported to the British Museum, reaching England in March 1856. Because of scholarly disagreements and rivalries, as well as issues of funding, studies and publications of the finds from Ashurbanipal's palace were produced slowly, with the first detailed analyses and studies not being published until the 1930s and 1940s.

Ashurbanipal's reign was the last time when Assyrian armies campaigned all across the Middle East. He is consequently typically regarded to have been the "last great king of Assyria". Ashurbanipal's reign is sometimes considered the apogee of the Neo-Assyrian Empire, though many scholars instead consider the preceding reign of Esarhaddon as such. Whether Ashurbanipal is to blame for the fall of the Assyrian Empire relatively quickly after his death is disputed. J. A. Delaunay, author of the Encyclopaedia Iranica entry on Ashurbanipal, writes that the Neo-Assyrian Empire under Ashurbanipal had already begun "exhibiting clear symptoms of impending dislocation and fall", while Donald John Wiseman, in the Encyclopaedia Britannica article on Ashurbanipal, holds that "It is no indictment of his rule that his empire fell within two decades after his death; this was due to external pressures rather than to internal strife". Gérard Chaliand holds that the fall of the Assyrian Empire should be blamed on Ashurbanipal's "mediocre heirs" rather than Ashurbanipal himself; there is however no evidence that his heirs were incompetent rulers. Sinsharishkun, under whom the empire collapsed, was a militarily competent ruler, utilizing the same tactics as his predecessors. Eckart Frahm believes the seeds of Assyria's fall were sown in Ashurbanipal's reign, in particular through the disconnect between the king and the traditional elite and through Ashurbanipal's sack of Babylon.

Ashurbanipal in popular culture 

Ashurbanipal has been the subject of numerous pieces of artwork created in modern times. In 1958, surrealist painter Leonora Carrington painted Assurbanipal Abluting Harpies, an oil on canvas at the Israel Museum depicting Ashurbanipal pouring a white substance onto the heads of pigeon-like creatures with human faces. A statue of the king, called Ashurbanipal, was created by sculptor Fred Parhad in 1988 and placed on a street near the San Francisco City Hall. The statue cost $100,000 and was described as the "first sizable bronze statue of Ashurbanipal". It was presented to the City of San Francisco as a gift from the Assyrian people on May 29, 1988, Parhad being of Assyrian descent. Some local Assyrians expressed fears that the statue resembled the legendary Mesopotamian hero Gilgamesh more than it resembled the actual Ashurbanipal. Parhad defended the statue as representing Ashurbanipal, though explained that he had taken some artistic liberties.

Ashurbanipal has also made occasional appearances in popular culture in various media. Robert E. Howard wrote a short story entitled The Fire of Asshurbanipal, first published in the December 1936 issue of Weird Tales magazine, about an "accursed jewel belonging to a king of long ago, whom the Grecians called Sardanapalus and the Semitic peoples Asshurbanipal". "The Mesopotamians", a 2007 song by They Might Be Giants, mentions Ashurbanipal alongside Sargon, Hammurabi. and Gilgamesh. Ashurbanipal was used as the ruler of the Assyrians in the game Civilization V.

Ashurbanipal once more entered the global spotlight and garnered increased fame in 2018, when reliefs from his reign were exhibited at the British Museum in the exhibition I am Ashurbanipal (8 November 2018 – 21 February 2019). The exhibition was well received, particularly due to its use of inventive technology, such as using lights to illustrate how many of Ashurbanipal's reliefs would have been painted in his lifetime, and its acknowledgement of the colonialist history of the collection itself. There was however also substantial controversy associated with the exhibition due to its sponsorship by the oil and gas company BP, involved in Middle Eastern oil since the early 20th century. The opening of the exhibition in November 2018 was met with protests, with protesters chanting slogans relating to BP's exploitation of Iraqi natural resources and pretending to sip oil-contaminated champagne.

Titles 

In an inscription on a cylinder dated to 648, Ashurbanipal used the following titles:

A similar titulature is used on one of Ashurbanipal's many tablets:

A longer variant is presented on one of Ashurbanipal's building inscriptions in Babylon:

See also 

 List of Assyrian kings
 Military history of the Neo-Assyrian Empire

Notes

References

Sources 

Bibliography
 
 
 
 
 
 
 
 
 
 
 
 
 
 
 
 
 
 
 
 
 
 
 
 
 
 
 
 
 
 
 
 
 
 
 
 
 
 
 
 
 
 
 
 
 
 
 
 
 
 
 
 
 
 
 
 
 
 
 
 
 
 
 
 
Web sources
 
 
 
 
 

Sargonid dynasty
7th-century BC Assyrian kings
680s BC births
631 BC deaths
Year of birth uncertain
Gyges of Lydia
Kings of the Universe
Kings of the Lands